Ivar Molde (born 29 September 1949) is a Norwegian politician for the Christian Democratic Party.

From 1973 to 1975 he was the chairman of the Youth of the Christian People's Party, the youth wing of the Christian Democratic Party. He took over the post from Kjell Magne Bondevik, who later became Prime Minister.

Molde later served as a deputy representative to the Norwegian Parliament from Hordaland during the term 1993–1997.

References

1949 births
Living people
Christian Democratic Party (Norway) politicians
Deputy members of the Storting